4OR - A Quarterly Journal of Operations Research is a peer-reviewed scientific journal that was 
established in 2003 and is published by Springer Science+Business Media. 
It is a joint official journal of the Belgian,
French, and
Italian Operations Research Societies. 
The journal publishes research papers and surveys on the theory and applications of Operations Research.
The Editors-in-chief are Yves Crama (University of Liège), 
Michel Grabisch (Pantheon-Sorbonne University), and Silvano Martello (University of Bologna).

Abstracting and indexing 
The journal is abstracted and indexed in the following databases:
 DBLP
 EconLit
 EBSCO Information Services
 Google Scholar
 International Abstracts in Operations Research
 Journal Citation Reports
 Mathematical Reviews
 OCLC
 ProQuest
 Science Citation Index
 SCImago Journal Rank
 Scopus
 Zentralblatt Math

According to the Journal Citation Reports, the journal has a 2021 impact factor of 1.763.

References

External links 
 

Operations research
Behavioural sciences 
English-language journals
Springer Science+Business Media academic journals
Publications established in 2003